Kalobaran Maiti (born 21 October 1967) is an Indian physicist specialising in condensed matter physics and materials science. He obtained his MSc degree from Rajabazar Science College and PhD degree from Indian Institute of Science, Bangalore. He was awarded the Shanti Swarup Bhatnagar Prize for Science and Technology in 2010, the highest science award in India, in the physical sciences category for his contribution in the field of very high resolution photoelectron spectroscopy in understanding the physics of metal-insulator transition, charge density wave and Kondo systems.  He is also  a 
Fellow of the National Academy of Sciences, Indian Academy of Sciences and the Indian National Science Academy.

He is a Professor of Condensed Matter Physics and Materials' Science in Tata Institute of Fundamental Research, Mumbai (TIFR). At TIFR, Maiti has built an electron spectrometer that can measure the energy of electrons with very high accuracy.

References

External links 
 Maiti's home page

Fellows of the Indian National Science Academy
Indian Institute of Science alumni
20th-century Indian physicists
Indian condensed matter physicists
Scientists from West Bengal